The Play That Song Tour was a concert tour by American pop rock band Train. It was in support of the group's tenth studio album, A Girl, a Bottle, a Boat (2017). The tour began on May 12, 2017, in Las Vegas and finished on October 25, 2017, in Belfast, Northern Ireland. Train announced the tour in January 2017.

In a review of the Salt Lake City show, Scott Tittrington from the Daily Herald felt that Train "still has that "it" factor that makes it must-see viewing and listening when it takes the stage." In a review of the Fresno show, Rory Appleton from the Fresno Bee said that seeing Train "on stage is to watch a master class in the rock/pop performance."

Opening acts
 O.A.R.
 Natasha Bedingfield

Setlist
This setlist is a representation of the Las Vegas show on May 12, 2017.
 "Drink Up"
 "50 Ways to Say Goodbye"
 "If It's Love"
 "Angel in Blue Jeans"
 "Valentine" 
 "Save Me, San Francisco"
 "Calling All Angels"
 "Bruises" 
 "Meet Virginia"
 "Drive By"
 "Marry Me"
 "You Can Call Me Al" 
 "Working Girl"
 Medley: "Mermaid"/"Shape of You"/"Cheap Thrills"/"Treat You Better"/"Lost and Found"
 "Hey, Soul Sister"
 "Play That Song"
Encore
 "You Better Believe"
 "Under Pressure" 
 "Drops of Jupiter (Tell Me)"

Notes: 
"Loverman" with snippets of The Marvelettes's "Please Mr. Postman" was performed in Los Angeles and Austin. At the LA show it was performed
with Priscilla Renea.
"When I Look to the Sky" was performed in Dallas.
"Soundgarden's "Black Hole Sun" was performed in Rogers, Pelham, Raleigh and Tampa in tribute to Chris Cornell
"Midnight Rider" was performed in Jacksonville in tribute of Gregg Allman who died the day before.

Tour dates

References

2017 concert tours
Train (band) concert tours